Phill Drobnick (born October 8, 1980 in Virginia, Minnesota) is an American curler who has been involved with curling since 1986.

Curling career 
Drobnick won the Minnesota State junior Championship in both, 2000 and 2003, allowing him to advance to the United States Junior National Championships. In 2000, Drobnick won the gold medal and advanced to the World Junior Championships in Geising, Germany, where he finished 6th. He competed in the United States Olympic curling trials for the 2002 and 2010 Winter Olympics, receiving bronze in the trials in 2001. At the 2011 United States Men's Curling Championship he played lead on Tyler George's team and finished 2nd, losing in the final to Pete Fenson.

Coaching career 
Drobnick started coaching the Chris Plys junior rink in the fall of 2006. Since then, Drobnick has coached the team through two Minnesota State junior Championships (2007 & 2008), two United States Junior Championships, and two World Junior Curling Championships. In 2008, they won the World Junior Championships in Östersund, Sweden, which was the first win for the United States in 24 years. In 2009 the Drobnick coached Team Plys returned to the World Junior Championship in and got bronze.  

He was the coach of the United States men's team at both the 2010 Winter Olympics and 2018 Winter Olympics. Both teams were skipped by John Shuster and in 2018 the team won the United States' first gold medal.  

In 2018 Drobnick was promoted to Director of Coaching for USA Curling where he will oversee a staff of six team coaches as well as coaching the men's national team.

Personal life 
Drobnick studied at the University of Minnesota Duluth. He still lives in Minnesota, where he is a probation officer in St. Louis County. In 2019 he was appointed to the Minnesota Commission on Judicial Selection.

References

External links

 

Living people
1980 births
American male curlers
American curling coaches